Eugena Gregg (born 8 February 1966) is a Saint Lucian former cricketer who played as a right-arm medium-fast bowler and right-handed batter. She appeared in ten One Day Internationals for the West Indies between 1993 and 1997. She played domestic cricket for Saint Lucia.

Gregg made her One Day International debut for the West Indies at the 1993 World Cup in England. She and Patricia Felicien were the only Saint Lucians in the squad, and the first Saint Lucians to be selected in any West Indies squad. At the World Cup, Gregg played in six of her team's seven matches, taking three wickets. She was retained in the squad for the 1997 World Cup in India, and appeared in every match at the tournament. In the ninth-place play-off against Denmark, she took 3/35 from seven overs, the best figures of her ODI career.

References

External links
 
 

Living people
1966 births
West Indian women cricketers
West Indies women One Day International cricketers
Saint Lucian women cricketers